Ribonucleotide-diphosphate reductase subunit M2 B is an enzyme that in humans is encoded by the RRM2B gene. The gene encoding the RRM2B protein is located on chromosome 8, at position 8q23.1. The gene and its products are also known by designations MTDPS8A, MTDPS8B, and p53R2.

Function
RRM2B codes for one of two versions of the R2 subunit of ribonucleotide reductase, which generates nucleotide precursors required for DNA replication by reducing ribonucleoside diphosphates to deoxyribonucloside diphosphates.  The version of R2 encoded by RRM2B is induced by p53, and is required for normal DNA repair and mtDNA synthesis in non-proliferating cells.  The other form of R2 is expressed only in dividing cells.

Interactions 

RRM2B has been shown to interact with Mdm2 and Ataxia telangiectasia mutated.

Clinical relevance
Abnormalities in this gene are one of the causes of mitochondrial DNA depletion syndrome (MDDS). Neonatal hypotonia, developmental delay, encephalopathy, with seizures, deafness and lactic acidosis have been associated with mutations in this gene.  MDDS is fatal, with death occurring from respiratory failure in early childhood.

It has been associated with some cases of pediatric acute liver failure.

Mutations in this gene have been shown to cause progressive external ophthalmoplegia.

Increased expression of RRM2B has been correlated with gemcitabine resistance in human cholangiocarcinoma cells and may be predictive of lack of clinical benefit from gemcitabine for human cancers.

References

Further reading 

 
 
 
 
 
 
 
 
 
 
 
 
 
 

EC 1.17.4